Computers are used to generate numeric models for the purpose of describing or displaying complex interaction among multiple variables within a system. The complexity of the system arises from the stochastic (probabilistic) nature of the events, rules for the interaction of the elements and the difficulty in perceiving the behavior of the systems as a whole with the passing of time.

Systems Simulation in Video Games
One of the most notable video games to incorporate systems simulation is Sim City, which simulates the multiple systems of a functioning city including but not limited to: electricity, water, sewage, public transportation, population growth, social interactions (including, but not limited to jobs, education and emergency response).

See also 
 Agent-based model
 Discrete event simulation
 NetLogo
 Systems Dynamics

References

External links
A Brief Introduction to Systems Simulation
Resources and Courses in Systems Simulation
Guide to the Winter Simulation Conference Collection 1968-2003, 2013-2014

Stochastic simulation
Systems theory